Xiguan Airport may refer to the following airports in China:

Xi'an Xiguan Airport, former airport serving Xi'an, Shaanxi
Hanzhong Xiguan Airport, former airport serving Hanzhong, Shaanxi
Fuyang Xiguan Airport, airport serving Fuyang, Anhui